The Yamaha FZR600 is a sports motorcycle produced by Yamaha between 1988 and 1996 (1999 in the USA). It was the successor to the FZ600 and was replaced by the Yamaha YZF600R in 1997. It had a steel Deltabox frame and swingarm, similar in appearance to the alloy Deltabox frame introduced three years earlier on the 1WG FZR400.

The four-valve Yamaha FZR600 engine was slanted forward in the frame.  This was the basis of the Genesis engine and Delta Box frame concept, and helped to lower the centre of gravity and help centralise mass.  This layout allowed the real fuel tank to sit behind the cylinders, low between the frame rails, and further aided with lowering the centre of gravity.  Forward of this sat the airbox, with four 32 mm Mikuni downdraft carburettors, and all these assemblies were covered by a plastic cover dummy petrol tank.

Unlike the larger FZR models, which had featured three intake valves and two exhaust valves per cylinder, the FZR600 had a four-valve-per-cylinder layout, necessitated by the different gas flow characteristics of the 600 cc engine over the 750 and 1,000 cc units in the FZR range. Many models came with the EXUP valve system, mandatory for units sold in California. This system located in the lower exhaust manifold helps maintain high back pressure at low engine speeds, and opens up more at higher engine speeds, giving the motor better mid-range power. The EXUP system was mainly found in US and some European models to compensate for the loss of power caused by emissions related modifications for those markets.

The original steel-framed '3HE' FZR600 remained virtually unchanged throughout its production.  In 1991 the FZR received a single trapezoid headlamp to ape its FZR1000 EXUP sibling, but Yamaha reverted to the twin headlamp design for 1993.  In 1990, the rear wheel width was increased to 4 inches (as opposed to the 3.5-inch wheel which was stock for the 1989 model).  In the same year the front brake calipers were upgraded to 4-piston units (as opposed to the 2-piston calipers on the 1989 model).  In 1991 the FZR received a different swingarm, which was slightly fatter in profile.  Aside from the minor mechanical changes, the paintwork and color schemes were the main change for each new model year, including the Vance and Hines special edition scheme that was available for 1992, only 636 were produced. 1994 saw the introduction of the 4JH model for European and Asian markets, the main difference being replacing the circular headlights with the now famous "Foxeye" style.

Notes

FZR600
Sport bikes
Motorcycles introduced in 1988